Myrsine salicina, synonym Rapanea salicina, commonly known as toro, is a species of shrub or small tree native to New Zealand.

Description 
Toro grows to 10 metres in height, with a trunk to 60 cm in diameter. It has long oblong shaped leaves that are thick, glossy and leathery. Clusters of small (3 – 5 mm across) cream to pale pink coloured flowers are produced along the branches in spring, followed by single seeded, reddy-orange fruits.

Distribution 
This species is found on both the North and South Islands from the North Cape to southern Westland. Its preferred habitat is lowland to montane forest.

Threats 
Toro is threatened in areas where the introduced possum occurs, as it is one of their preferred foods.

References

salicina
Flora of New Zealand